"International Love" is a song by American rapper Pitbull from his sixth studio album, Planet Pit (2011). The song features vocals from American R&B singer Chris Brown. The song was written by Pitbull, Soulshock, Peter Biker, Sean Hurley and Claude Kelly. It was also produced by Soulshock, Biker and Hurley.

The song was first released on May 27, 2011, as the first promotional single from the album. However, on October 11, 2011, the single started airing on rhythmic radio in the US, and was finally released as the fourth and final official single on November 1, 2011, when it impacted US mainstream radio. It peaked at number 13 on the US Billboard Hot 100 chart.

The song also received publicity when it was featured prominently in the trailer for the 2012 film Step Up Revolution.

Background and composition 

"International Love" first appeared online in January 2011. Later that year, "International Love" was released as a promotional single on May 29, 2011. Later, the song was released as the fourth official single from the album on November 1, 2011.

The song was written by Pitbull, Soulshock, Peter Biker, Sean Hurley and Claude Kelly, and it was produced by Soulshock, Biker and Hurley. American R&B recording artist Chris Brown provides guest vocals on the hook and bridge. The song is a dance-pop song and is written in the key of C minor, following the strong world dance music feel of the other singles of the album.

Critical reception 
Robbie Daw of Idolator wrote: "It is an energetic floorfiller not unlike Breezy’s current hit 'Yeah 3x', and it finds the two praising women. Of course, there are no women like the ones in Miami for Pitbull. We can totally hear this finding a home on the radio." Bill Lamb of About.com praised Brown's vocal performance, writing: "Chris Brown delivers a beautiful vocal on the choruses." Jesse Cataldo of Slant Magazine wrote: "The track might have felt convincing. As delivered by Pitbull and Chris Brown, it feels juvenile and boastful, a puerile fantasy with zero appeal."

Josh Langhoff of PopMatters commented: "So in the interest of increasing his market share and his genetic footprint, Pitbull has decided to grow his brand and sink it deep into virgin territory. He positions himself for action, feels out the strategic gaps, and fills them with his acumen, forever keeping his eye on the back end." Richard of "DJ Booth" stated: "The Claude Kelly-penned smash is a Pit single par excellence, with all the dancefloor-scorching synth grooves and brilliantly mindless rhymes that entails. In between the headliner’s globally-conscious expressions of horniness, R&B heavyweight Chris Brown takes the reins, adding a dose of star power on the hook and bridge."

Chart performance
"International Love" debuted at number 59 on the US Billboard Hot 100 chart, on the week of February 11, 2012. The song was originally released at a promo single for the album. The song left the chart in the following week. Five months later, the single re-entered the chart at number 92 after the song was released for Mainstream airplay. After climbing the chart for the 11 more weeks, it reached its peak at number 13 on the chart, on the week of February 11, 2012. The single also peaked at number one on US Hot Dance Club Songs chart. On October 16, 2020, the single was certified triple platinum by the Recording Industry Association of America (RIAA) for combined sales and streaming equivalent units of over three million units in the United States.

Outside of the US, "International Love" entered the ARIA Singles Charts in Australia at number 48 on November 27, 2011, due to strong digital sales from the album. Following the single's official release, the song re-entered the chart at number 34 on January 15, 2012, and has since peaked at number 27. It has been certified gold by the Australian Recording Industry Association (ARIA) for sales of 35,000 digital downloads. In the United Kingdom, "International Love" debuted at number 142 on the UK Singles Chart on the issue dated December 14, 2011. The following week, the song rose to number 99, before dropping to number 94 the week after. In its fourth week on the chart, rose to number 44. The following week, it moved to number 23 after selling 12,639 units. In its sixth week on the chart, the song reached number thirteen with sales of 18,620 copies. It eventually reached its peaked at number ten on the chart. It also reached number one in Slovakia.

Music video 
The music video was first released onto Pitbull's official Vevo channel on December 8, 2011. The video shows the duo traveling the world by CGI and green screen effects. The various cityscapes are projected behind the sharply dressed guys as they rap and sing about living it up and loving the many ladies around the world. The video has received over 677 million views.

In the song, Pitbull rapped two verses but in the video, he rapped three verses, a new verse in the beginning. Erin Strecker of Entertainment Weeklys Music Mix, described the video, writing: "The extra-planetary party is a greenscreen orgy in the sky, complete with women, dance moves, and some oddly placed all-American body paint (at 3:20)."

Live performances
The duo performed the song on February 16, 2012, at the Premio Lo Nuestro 2012. Brown's performance was criticized because of his bad lip-synching. On February 26, 2012, the song was performed by both singers in a medley during the halftime of 2012 NBA All-Star Game in Orlando.

Track listing
Digital download
"International Love" – 3:49

CD single
"International Love" (Album version) – 3:49
"International Love" (Jump Smokers! Radio Mix) – 4:27

Credits and personnel
Credits adapted from Planet Pit album liner notes.

Pitbull – songwriter
Soulshock – songwriter, producer, arranger, instrumentation, recording and mixing
Peter Biker – songwriter, producer, arranger and instrumentation
Sean Hurley – songwriter, keyboards and additional production
Claude Kelly – songwriter and backing vocals
Al Burna – Pitbull vocal recording
Brian Springer – Chris Brown vocal recording
Manny Marroquin – mixing
Erik Madrid – assistant mixing
Chris Galland – assistant mixing

Charts

Weekly charts

Year-end charts

Certifications

|-

Release history

See also
 List of number-one dance singles of 2012 (U.S.)

References

External links
 
 

2011 singles
2011 songs
Pitbull (rapper) songs
Songs written by Pitbull (rapper)
Songs written by Claude Kelly
Songs written by Sean Hurley (songwriter)
Songs written by Soulshock